Arrowette is a superheroine that appear in American comic books published by DC Comics.

Publication history
The Bonnie King version of Arrowette appears in World's Finest Comics #113 and was created by Dave Wood and Lee Elias.

The Cissie King-Jones version of Arrowette appears in Impulse #28 and was created by Tom Peyer and Craig Rousseau.

Biography

Bonnie King
The first Arrowette (properly known as Miss Arrowette) is Bonnie King, a would-be sidekick and general nuisance to Green Arrow. She first appears in World's Finest Comics #113 (November 1960).

When Bonnie was a child, her mother Millie put her through archery training and was very controlling of her progress. She does well and ends up competing in the Olympic Games, where she wins a bronze medal. However, her mother is not pleased as she had expected Bonnie to win a gold, and harasses her daughter over Bonnie's alleged failure. This ends up driving Bonnie to abandon both her home and archery and she never speaks to her mother again.

Alone in Star City, she eventually becomes inspired by Green Arrow and Speedy and decides to use her archery skills in a way that counted. She makes a costume for herself and names herself "Miss" Arrowette. Like Green Arrow, she carries trick arrows but with a feminine slant (such as the "Powder Puff" Arrow). She attempts to aid both archers a few times, but they repeatedly rebuff her attempts. Despite her good intentions, Arrowette turns out to be too clumsy to become a hero and too vain to even wear a mask. Arrowette briefly dates the Green Arrow in his civilian identity of Oliver Queen, as shown in Justice League of America #7 (October–November 1961).

At some point, she meets a journalist named Bernell "Bowstring" Jones, who remembers her from her Olympic Games and is probably the only person to consider her a star. She nicknames him Bowstring because he is as thin as one and takes him briefly as her sidekick so he will give her publicity in his journal. Eventually, however, Green Arrow convinces Arrowette to give up superheroism.

She has to permanently give up archery due to carpal tunnel syndrome in her wrists, and also due to her job as a secretary. She talks Bowstring into marrying her and, one year later, she has a daughter they name Cissie King-Jones. When Bowstring dies five years later from fish poisoning, Hal Jordan (working as an agent for the company that holds Bowstring's life insurance policy) gives Bonnie and Cissie the policy's beneficiary check; the money enables Bonnie to train Cissie into a superhero. Cissie hardly has time to breathe between lessons of archery, judo, kick-boxing, gymnastics, ballet, and many other fields, and eventually comes to resent her mother deeply.

Bonnie's name is a parody or play on Green Arrow's civilian name, Oliver "Ollie" Queen.

Cissie King-Jones
Forced by her mother to adopt a version of her old costume, Suzanne "Cissie" King-Jones becomes the second Arrowette. Arrowette first appears in the pages of Impulse wearing a frilly costume and a bejeweled mask that apes her mother's old costume. Despite Arrowette's success as a heroine, Impulse's mentor, Max Mercury, is concerned by what he sees as Bonnie's exploitation of her daughter. Child Welfare Services gets involved, and Bonnie loses custody of her daughter, who is sent to the Elias School for Girls, a boarding school.

Arrowette next appears in Young Justice #4 wearing a more practical costume. Acting alone, she battles the villainous Harm and is injured by him with one of her own arrows. She manages to escape and contact Young Justice, later joining the team, along with the second Wonder Girl (Cassie Sandsmark) and Secret (Greta Hayes). The three quickly become close friends, although Cissie admits during a game of 'Truth or Dare' that, if put in a position where she had a choice to quit being a hero, she would ask her mother's advice and then do the opposite to establish herself as an independent person.

After her school therapist—one of the few adults whom Cissie trusted—is brutally murdered, Cissie tracks down the killers in a violent rage. She nearly kills one of them herself, but is stopped by Superboy. Cissie is so shaken by the incident that she vows never to be Arrowette again.

Despite leaving the team, Cissie remains close friends with her teammates and eventually reconciles with her mother, who convinces her daughter to try out for the "Summer Games" in Sydney (a thinly-veiled reference to the 2000 Summer Olympics, due to DC not being an "official partner" of the Games). With her battle-honed abilities, Cissie ends up taking home the gold, and becomes something of a celebrity, guest-starring on Superboy's favorite TV show, "Wendy the Werewolf Stalker" (a parody of Buffy the Vampire Slayer). She helps the Red Tornado's daughter, Traya, adjust to life at Elias and later, when Secret was returned to humanity, Cissie helps to organize placement for her at the same school.

Now retired from superheroics, Cissie never expresses any desire to return to her life as a superhero, despite the best efforts of several of her former teammates. They even involve her in a baseball game on an alien planet, with the fate of many innocents riding on the outcome. Cissie is enraged because they chose her instead of many other superhumans, but she participates as best as she can. Her team barely wins. Cissie still remains committed to justice and compassion. During the Imperiex war, she served as medical aid volunteer, again working with Young Justice, although the team is again divided due to uncertainty about Robin's loyalty to them after the discovery of Batman's files on the Justice League.

Cissie made a brief appearance in Teen Titans vol. 3 #7 when Helen Sandsmark attempts to enroll Wonder Girl into the Elias School (which seems to have expanded its student body to boys as well as girls). With Greta Hayes (formerly Secret), the girls threaten to leave the school and take Cissie's celebrity status as a gold-winning archer with her if Wonder Girl is not allowed to enroll. The school gives in to her demands. Cissie makes a second appearance in Teen Titans and Outsiders Secret Files 2005, joining Wonder Girl on a trip to San Francisco, California. Cissie wishes to give her best friend moral support as Cassie battles with the decision to tell her friends that her father was the Greek God, Zeus. At the funeral for her former YJ teammate, Bart Allen, she is mentioned in passing during a video made by Bart prior to his death. Cissie also makes a flashback cameo in Teen Titans #50.

Cissie was last seen hanging out with Cassie and Anita in Wonder Girl #2, now sporting short hair. She is seen again in Wonder Girl #3 with Anita, as they help Cassie realize that she has truly gotten over Superboy's death. For the first time since 'retiring' from super-hero work in the pages of Young Justice, Cissie wears a new Arrowette costume that resembles the second one to aid Wonder Girl rescue her mother in Wonder Girl #4.

Skills and abilities
Cissie is a normal human with above average strength, stamina and agility for a girl of her age. She has exceptional hand-to-hand combatant ability, being highly skilled in judo, jeet kune do and kickboxing with skills as an Olympic gold-medalist longbow marksman and possesses above average intelligence.

Other versions

Flashpoint
In the Flashpoint universe, the Cissie King-Jones version of Arrowette joined with the Amazons' Furies.

The Multiversity
In the series The Multiversity an alternate universe Arrowette named Cissie King-Hawke appears. She is the spoiled and popular daughter of Connor Hawke. Cissie is seen wanting to start her own superhero team called The Just however her father shows disapproval doubting she has experience to survive a life of crime fighting.

In other media
 In February 2010, actress Stephanie Lemelin said that she had been cast as the voice of Arrowette for an animated adaptation of Young Justice, but her character was later changed to Artemis Crock. Instead, Kelly Stables voices Cissie King-Jones / Arrowette. The series' version of Arrowette is a member of the Team.
 The Cissie King-Jones incarnation of Arrowette appears in DC Super Hero Girls as a student of Super Hero High.

References

External links
Miss Arrowette at the Unofficial Guide to the DC Universe 
Arrowette at the Unofficial Guide to the DC Universe 
Spider-Bob Profile

Articles about multiple fictional characters
Comics characters introduced in 1960
Comics characters introduced in 1997
Characters created by Lee Elias
Green Arrow characters
DC Comics sidekicks
DC Comics female superheroes
DC Comics martial artists
Fictional archers
Fictional Olympic competitors